Nallala Odelu is an Indian politician. He belongs to Bharath Rastra Samithi. He is an ex- MLA from Chennur Assembly Constituency.

References

Living people
Telangana Rashtra Samithi politicians
Andhra Pradesh MLAs 2009–2014
Telangana MLAs 2014–2018
Year of birth missing (living people)